Anna Konishi (Kanji:, Konsihi Anna, born 10 May 1996) is a Japanese backstroke swimmer. She qualified to represent Japan at the 2020 Summer Olympics in Tokyo 2021. She placed 13th in women's 100 metre backstroke, 8th in mixed 4 × 100 metre medley relay, and 8th in women's 4 × 100 metre medley relay with the Japanese teams.

References

External links
 

 

1996 births
Living people
Japanese female backstroke swimmers
Swimmers at the 2020 Summer Olympics
Olympic swimmers of Japan
Medalists at the 2017 Summer Universiade
Universiade gold medalists for Japan
Sportspeople from Hyōgo Prefecture
Asian Games medalists in swimming
Asian Games gold medalists for Japan
Asian Games silver medalists for Japan
Swimmers at the 2018 Asian Games
Medalists at the 2018 Asian Games
Universiade medalists in swimming
21st-century Japanese women